Joseph Minto Laws (6 July 1897 – 29 August 1952) was an English professional footballer who played as a winger.

References

1897 births
1952 deaths
Footballers from County Durham
English footballers
Association football wingers
Spennymoor United F.C. players
Grimsby Town F.C. players
Worksop Town F.C. players
York City F.C. players
Nottingham Forest F.C. players
Southport F.C. players
Macclesfield Town F.C. players
Ashton National F.C. players
Chorley F.C. players
English Football League players